Körfuboltakvöld (English: Basketball Night), known as Subway's Körfuboltakvöld for sponsorship reasons, is the postgame show for Úrvalsdeild karla and Úrvalsdeild kvenna broadcasts. Originally known as Domino's Körfuboltakvöld, the program features hosts Kjartan Atli Kjartansson and Pálína Gunnlaugsdóttir with analysts Hermann Hauksson, Sævar Sævarsson, Kristinn Friðriksson, Fannar Ólafsson and Teitur Örlygsson, with supporting or fill-in analysts including Benedikt Guðmundsson and Ágúst Björgvinsson. In October 2020, he received the Eddan award for best television material of the year in the general election of Icelandic television viewers.

Recurring segments
Fannar skammar (English: Fannar shames) – A blooper segment where Fannar Ólafsson goes over previous games bloopers and failures.
Framlenging (English: Overtime) – A discussion segment where each analyst has 30 seconds to explain his opinion on a certain topic.

Current
Kjartan Atli Kjartansson – host
Pálína Gunnlaugsdóttir – host
Benedikt Guðmundsson – analyst
Berglind Gunnarsdóttir – analyst
Bryndís Guðmundsdóttir – analyst
Fannar Ólafsson – analyst and Fannar skammar presenter
Hermann Hauksson – analyst
Jón Halldór Eðvaldsson – analyst
Kristinn Friðriksson – analyst
Ólöf Helga Pálsdóttir – analyst
Ragna Margrét Brynjarsdóttir – analyst 
Sævar Sævarsson – analyst
Teitur Örlygsson – analyst
Finnur Freyr Stefánsson – fill-in analyst
Stefán Árni Pálsson – fill-in host
Ágúst Björgvinsson – fill-in analyst
Darri Freyr Atlason – analyst
Friðrik Ragnarsson – analyst
Matthías Orri Sigurðarson – analyst

References

2015 Icelandic television series debuts
2010s Icelandic television series
Stöð 2 original programming